Henry Richter may refer to:

 Henry Constantine Richter (1821–1902), zoological illustrator
 Henry James Richter (1772–1857), artist and philosopher
 Henry Richter (bishop) (1838–1916), German-born prelate of the Roman Catholic Church